Web of Suspicion is a 1959 British crime film directed by Max Varnel and starring Philip Friend and Susan Beaumont. It was produced by the Danziger Brothers.

Premise
Schoolteacher Bradley Wells is wrongly accused of murdering a girl pupil, and is nearly lynched by angry townspeople. With the help of his art teacher girlfriend Janet he discovers the real murderer, and works with Janet to clear his name and save the school from another tragedy.

Cast
Philip Friend as Bradley Wells
Susan Beaumont as Janet Shenley
John Martin as Eric Turner
Peter Sinclair as Tom Wright
Robert Raglan as Inspector Clark
Peter Elliott as Watson
Ian Fleming as Forbes
John Brooking as Holt
Hal Osmond as Charlie

References

External links

1959 films
British crime drama films
1950s English-language films
1950s British films